Arif Aqueel (born 14 January 1952) is an Indian politician and a member of the Indian National Congress party.
He is the first Muslim MLA from Bhopal Uttar in the state of Madhya Pradesh. He served as a Cabinet Minister, Ministry of Minority Affairs and Backward Classes, Ministry of Bhopal Gas Relief and Distribution, Ministry of Medium and Small Enterprises, Government of Madhya Pradesh. He is the only Muslim minister in Madhya Pradesh to hold this post after a gap of 15 years.

Political career
He became an MLA in 1990 from Bhopal North constituency and has since been representing it.

Arif Aqueel (also known and referred to as “Sher-e-Bhopal” English translation “The Lion of Bhopal”) started his political career as an activist student leader in 1972. He was appointed President of Saifia College Student Committee in 1977, and in the same year he was elected as Vice President of Youth Congress and NSUI (National Student Union of India) of Madhya Pradesh.

He won his first MLA election, as an independent MLA, in the 9th assembly election by defeating senior Congress leader and ex-Minister Hasanat Siddiqui in 1990.

For almost three decades, politics in Old Bhopal has centred around one man—Arif Aqueel. It has happened several times that BJP won all the seats in Bhopal, except Arif Aqueel's constituency—Bhopal North & saved Congress’ prestige in the State capital.

Again in 1993 he contested MLA election under the patronage of Janta Dal Party, however, he was overtaken by Ramesh Sharma of BJP Party by small margin. In 1995 he was appointed member of MP Waqf Board and Bar Council, in the same year was elected as President of Nagrik Sahakari Bank.

In 1996 he rejoined Congress Party and in 1998 he contested MLA election and won the eleventh (11th) assembly election by defeating his old rival Ramesh Sharma of BJP.

During 1998 till 2003, Arif Aqueel held many Cabinet Minister positions under Congress Party's Chief Minister Digvijaya Singh of Madhya Pradesh Legislative Assembly. He was nominated as Minister of Minority Welfare, Minister of Bhopal Gas Rahat, Minister of Backward and Porniwass Department. He was also appointed President of MP Hajj Committee.

He again triumphed in the twelfth (12th) assembly election as MLA in 2003, and from February till June 2004 he served as secretary of Vidhan Sabha for Congress and in 2007, he was nominated as Vice President of Madhya Pradesh Congress Committee.

In 2008 he was elected again as an MLA in thirteenth (13th) assembly, in 2012 he became the President of Bhopal Divisional Cricket Association and member of MP Cricket Association, and in 2013 he was appointed Member of Election Committee of Congress for ticket distribution.

In 2013 he was elected again in the fourteenth (14th) assembly MLA election by defeating ex-Cabinet Minister of India Arif Beg who served as National Minister under Atal Bihari Vajpayee Prime Minister of India.

Political views
He supports Congress Party's ideology.

Personal life
He is married to Saira Aqueel.

He has one daughter and three sons; (eldest to youngest), Erum Aqueel,  Majid Aqueel, Atif Aqueel and Abid Aqueel.

His daughter is married to Khalid Masoud, a General Manager employed at UPS (United Parcel Service inc.) in Saudi Arabia.

Atif Aqueel, is one of the fastest rising young politicians of Bhopal.

See also
Madhya Pradesh Legislative Assembly
2013 Madhya Pradesh Legislative Assembly election
2008 Madhya Pradesh Legislative Assembly election
2003 Madhya Pradesh Legislative Assembly election
1998 Madhya Pradesh Legislative Assembly election
1993 Madhya Pradesh Legislative Assembly election
1990 Madhya Pradesh Legislative Assembly election

References

External links

1952 births
Living people
Madhya Pradesh MLAs 1990–1992
Madhya Pradesh MLAs 1993–1998
Madhya Pradesh MLAs 1998–2003
Madhya Pradesh MLAs 2003–2008
Madhya Pradesh MLAs 2008–2013
Madhya Pradesh MLAs 2013–2018
Politicians from Bhopal
Indian National Congress politicians from Madhya Pradesh